Pablo Olmedo Castañón (born May 8, 1975 in Mexico City) is a middle and long-distance runner from Mexico.

He twice won the gold medal in the men's 5.000 metres at the Central American and Caribbean Games, and competed for his native country at the 2000 Summer Olympics in Sydney, Australia.

International competitions

References

sports-reference
Picture of Pablo Olmedo

1975 births
Living people
Athletes from Mexico City
Mexican male long-distance runners
Mexican male middle-distance runners
Olympic athletes of Mexico
Athletes (track and field) at the 2000 Summer Olympics
World Athletics Championships athletes for Mexico
Pan American Games competitors for Mexico
Athletes (track and field) at the 1999 Pan American Games
Athletes (track and field) at the 2003 Pan American Games
Central American and Caribbean Games gold medalists for Mexico
Central American and Caribbean Games silver medalists for Mexico
Competitors at the 1998 Central American and Caribbean Games
Competitors at the 2002 Central American and Caribbean Games
Central American and Caribbean Games medalists in athletics
20th-century Mexican people
21st-century Mexican people